Deno M Davie (born 1965), is a male retired cyclist who competed for England.

Cycling career
He represented England and competed in the road race and won a gold medal in the road team time trial with Alan Gornall, Keith Reynolds and Paul Curran, at the 1986 Commonwealth Games in Edinburgh, Scotland.

He won one National Championship and was a professional from 1988-1989.

References

1965 births
English male cyclists
Commonwealth Games medallists in cycling
Commonwealth Games gold medallists for England
Cyclists at the 1986 Commonwealth Games
Living people
Medallists at the 1986 Commonwealth Games